Pflimlin is a surname. Notable people with the surname include:

Étienne Pflimlin (born 1941), French high-ranking civil servant and banker
Pierre Pflimlin (1907-2000), French politician
Pierre Pflimlin Bridge, named for the aforementioned
Rémy Pflimlin (1954-2016), French media executive